Magnificent Roughnecks is a 1956 American comedy film directed by Sherman A. Rose and written by Stephen Kandel. The film stars Jack Carson, Mickey Rooney, Nancy Gates, Jeff Donnell, Myron Healey and Willis Bouchey. The film was released on July 22, 1956, by Allied Artists Pictures.

Plot
Under contract with an oil company, engineer Bix Decker and geologist Frank Sommers have been working in South America, but now Bix intends to go home. He changes his mind when replacement Jane Rivers shows up, at first skeptical because she's a woman, then eager to work together.

A rival oil rigger, Werner Jackson, enjoys taunting Bix about a woman doing his job and punches Frank when he tries to intervene. Bix is impressed by Jane's work, but when he tries to kiss her, he gets slapped. His girlfriend Julie also is upset at seeing them together.

During an emergency, after a casing fails, Bix and Frank try to drive nitroglycerine to the well to blow it up and extinguish the fire. Werner blocks the way, but Bix uses a bulldozer to cover him in dirt. A gusher erupts, dousing the blaze. It's time for Bix to return home, but his contract is extended six more months so he can stay behind and work with Jane.

Cast
Jack Carson as Bix Decker
Mickey Rooney as Frank Sommers
Nancy Gates as Jane Rivers
Jeff Donnell as Julie
Myron Healey as Werner Jackson
Willis Bouchey as Ernie Biggers
Eric Feldary as Señor Ramon Serrano
Alan Wells as Danny
Frank Gerstle as Chuck Evans
Larry Carr as Guard
Matty Fain as Pepi
Jon Locke as Driver

References

External links
 

1956 films
American comedy films
1956 comedy films
Films scored by Paul Dunlap
Works about petroleum
1950s English-language films
1950s American films
American black-and-white films